Poštulka (feminine Poštulková) is a Czech surname. Notable people with the surname include:

 Jan Poštulka (born 1949), Czech football player and coach
 Marek Poštulka (born 1970), Czech footballer
 Tomáš Poštulka (born 1974), Czech footballer

Czech-language surnames